Éric Junior Dina Ebimbe (born 21 November 2000), also known as Éric Ebimbe and Junior Dina Ebimbe, is a French professional footballer who plays as a midfielder for Bundesliga club Eintracht Frankfurt, on loan from Ligue 1 club Paris Saint-Germain.

Club career

Paris Saint-Germain
Developed in the Paris Saint-Germain Academy, Dina Ebimbe signed his first professional contract with Paris Saint-Germain on 2 July 2018. He spent the 2018–19 season with the reserve team.

2019–20: Loan to Le Havre
On 5 July 2019, Le Havre announced that Dina Ebimbe had joined the Ligue 2 side on loan. Three weeks later on 26 July, he made his professional debut in a 2–2 draw against Ajaccio. He scored his first professional goal on 30 August 2019, in a 3–0 win against Caen.

2020–21: Loan to Dijon
On 6 July 2020, Dijon announced the loan signing of Dina Ebimbe with an option to buy. He made his debut in a 1–0 defeat to Angers on 22 August. On 9 June 2021, Dijon exercised the option-to-buy in Dina Ebimbe's loan deal. However, Paris Saint-Germain exercised their right to veto Dijon's purchase. Dijon received a transfer fee in compensation.

2021–22: Return to Paris Saint-Germain
Ahead of the 2021–22 season, Dina Ebimbe returned to Paris Saint-Germain. He participated in pre-season, and went on to make his professional debut for the club in 1–0 Trophée des Champions loss to Lille on 1 August 2021. Dina Ebimbe made his Ligue 1 debut for PSG in a 2–1 win over Troyes on 7 August.

2022–23: Loan to Eintracht Frankfurt
On 21 August 2022, Dina Ebimbe extended his contract with PSG until June 2024 and joined Bundesliga club Eintracht Frankfurt on a season-long loan deal with an option to buy, made mandatory should the club survive relegation.

International career 
Dina Ebimbe is a France youth international. He has represented his nation at under-20 and under-21 level.

Personal life
Born in France, Dina Ebimbe is of Cameroonian descent.

Career statistics

Honours
Paris Saint-Germain
Ligue 1: 2021–22

Individual
Bundesliga Rookie of the Month: October 2022; November 2022

References

External links

 
 
 

2000 births
Living people
Black French sportspeople
French sportspeople of Cameroonian descent
Association football midfielders
Footballers from Seine-Saint-Denis
French footballers
France youth international footballers
France under-21 international footballers
Paris Saint-Germain F.C. players
Le Havre AC players
Dijon FCO players
Eintracht Frankfurt players
Ligue 1 players
Ligue 2 players
French expatriate footballers
French expatriate sportspeople in Germany
Expatriate footballers in Germany